Ronald Andrew Jhun Jr. (born September 21, 1970) is an American professional mixed martial artist who most recently competed in the Welterweight division. A professional competitor since 1998, Jhun has formerly competed for the UFC, Strikeforce, Shooto, King of the Cage, Rumble on the Rock, and the World Fighting Alliance. Jhun is the former King of the Cage Welterweight Champion.

Background
Born and raised in Honolulu, Hawaii, Jhun competed in football through high school and also competed in wrestling during his junior and senior years. After graduating, Jhun was introduced to mixed martial arts by his brother-in-law, Ray Cooper, and David Pa'aluhi, who would both also go on to have success as professional MMA fighters.

Mixed martial arts career

Early career
Jhun made his professional mixed martial arts debut in 1998, competing under the SuperBrawl banner. Jhun compiled an overall record of 21–11–1 and won the King of the Cage Welterweight Championship before being signed by the UFC.

UFC and Strikeforce
Jhun made his UFC debut on August 21, 2004 at UFC 49 against Chris Lytle. Jhun was defeated via guillotine choke submission in the first round.

Jhun returned to the regional circuit, and went on a ten-fight losing streak during which he competed at Strikeforce: Triple Threat against Eugene Jackson in a Middleweight bout on December 8, 2006. Jhun, who had faced Jackson in his professional debut, again lost in the rematch via rear-naked choke submission in the first round.

Independent promotions
Jhun has gone 2–6 in his last eight fights, but on August 7, 2010, defeated Michael Winkelspecht via rear-naked choke submission in the second round to become the X-1 Middleweight Champion.

Personal life
Jhun is married and has five children.

Mixed martial arts record

|-
| Loss
| align=center| 
| Zebaztian Kadestam
| TKO (leg kicks) 	
| PXC: Pacific Xtreme Combat 35
| 
| align=center| 1
| align=center| N/A
| Pasig, Philippines
|
|-
| Loss
| align=center| 24–25–2
| Dave Courchaine
| Submission (rear-naked choke) 	
| Destiny MMA: Na Koa 2
| 
| align=center| 1
| align=center| 3:52
| Honolulu, Hawaii, United States
| 
|-
| Loss
| align=center| 24–24–2
| A Sol Kwon
| Submission (rear-naked choke) 	
| HEAT 16
| 
| align=center| 2
| align=center| 4:43
| Osaka, Japan
| 
|-
| Win
| align=center| 24–23–2
| Yoshitaro Niimi
| Decision (unanimous)
| HEAT 15
| 
| align=center| 3
| align=center| 5:00
| Nagoya, Japan
| 
|-
| Win
| align=center| 23–23–2
| Michael Winkelspecht
| Submission (rear-naked choke)
| X-1 vs. Destiny MMA: Showdown in Waipahu 3
| 
| align=center| 2
| align=center| 4:06
| Honolulu, Hawaii, United States
| 
|-
| Loss
| align=center| 22–23–2
| Dylan Clay
| TKO (corner stoppage)
| X-1: Legends
| 
| align=center| 1
| align=center| 5:00
| Honolulu, Hawaii, United States
| 
|-
| Loss
| align=center| 22–22–2
| James Fanshier
| Submission (armbar)
| KOTC: No Holds Barred
| 
| align=center| 3
| align=center| 0:43
| Porterville, California, United States
| 
|-
| Loss
| align=center| 22–21–2
| Jeremiah Metcalf
| Submission (rear-naked choke)
| Gladiator Challenge 63
| 
| align=center| 4
| align=center| 1:44
| Tahoe, California, United States
| 
|-
| Loss
| align=center| 22–20–2
| Eugene Jackson
| Submission (rear-naked choke)
| Strikeforce: Triple Threat
| 
| align=center| 1
| align=center| 2:01
| San Jose, California, United States
|
|-
| Loss
| align=center| 22–19–2
| Akira Kikuchi
| Submission (armlock)
| Shooto: Champion Carnival
| 
| align=center| 1
| align=center| 1:58
| Yokohama, Japan
| 
|-
| Loss
| align=center| 22–18–2
| Keita Nakamura
| Technical Submission (rear-naked choke)
| Punishment in Paradise: East vs. West
| 
| align=center| 1
| align=center| 3:55
| Honolulu, Hawaii, United States
| 
|-
| Loss
| align=center| 22–17–2
| Antonio McKee
| Decision (split)
| Extreme Wars 3
| 
| align=center| 3
| align=center| 5:00
| Oakland, California, United States
| 
|-
| Loss
| align=center| 22–16–2
| Frank Trigg
| Decision (unanimous)
| Rumble on the Rock 8
| 
| align=center| 3
| align=center| 5:00
| Honolulu, Hawaii, United States
| 
|-
| Loss
| align=center| 22–15–2
| Thales Leites
| TKO (doctor stoppage)
| Rumble on the Rock: Qualifiers
| 
| align=center| 3
| align=center| 0:32
| Honolulu, Hawaii, United States
| 
|-
| Loss
| align=center| 22–14–2
| Jay Hieron
| TKO (cut)
| Lockdown in Paradise 1
| 
| align=center| 1
| align=center| 4:34
| Lahaina, Hawaii, United States
| 
|-
| Win
| align=center| 22–13–2
| Shigetoshi Iwase
| Decision (unanimous)
| Punishment in Paradise 9
| 
| align=center| 3
| align=center| 5:00
| Hawaii, United States
| 
|-
| Loss
| align=center| 21–13–2
| Jason Miller
| Technical Submission (arm-triangle choke)
| SuperBrawl 37
| 
| align=center| 2
| align=center| N/A
| Kapolei, Hawaii, United States
| 
|-
| Loss
| align=center| 21–12–2
| Chris Lytle
| Submission (guillotine choke)
| UFC 49
| 
| align=center| 2
| align=center| 1:17
| Las Vegas, Nevada, United States
| 
|-
| Win
| align=center| 21–11–2
| Ryan Schultz
| TKO (corner stoppage)
| Rumble on the Rock 5
| 
| align=center| 2
| align=center| 5:00
| Honolulu, Hawaii, United States
| 
|-
| Win
| align=center| 20–11–2
| Kyle Brees
| TKO
| SuperBrawl 33
| 
| align=center| 3
| align=center| 4:40
| Honolulu, Hawaii, United States
| 
|-
| Win
| align=center| 19–11–2
| Andrew Chappelle
| Decision (unanimous)
| Ring of Honor 3
| 
| align=center| 3
| align=center| 5:00
| ʻEwa Beach, Hawaii, United States
| 
|-
| Win
| align=center| 18–11–2
| Sean Taylor
| TKO (corner stoppage)
| Rumble on the Rock 4
| 
| align=center| 2
| align=center| 3:05
| Honolulu, Hawaii, United States
| 
|-
| Loss
| align=center| 17–11–2
| Tiki Ghosn
| Decision (split)
| SuperBrawl 31
| 
| align=center| 3
| align=center| 5:00
| Honolulu, Hawaii, United States
| 
|-
| Loss
| align=center| 17–10–2
| John Alessio
| Decision (unanimous)
| KOTC 29: Renegades
| 
| align=center| 5
| align=center| 5:00
| San Jacinto, California, United States
| 
|-
| Win
| align=center| 17–9–2
| Shonie Carter
| Decision (unanimous)
| KOTC 23: Sin City
| 
| align=center| 5
| align=center| 5:00
| Las Vegas, Nevada, United States
| 
|-
| Win
| align=center| 16–9–2
| James Meals
| TKO (submission to strikes)
| Kaos Fighting Championships 2
| 
| align=center| N/A
| align=center| N/A
| Honolulu, Hawaii, United States
| 
|-
| Win
| align=center| 15–9–2
| Mike Penalber
| Decision (unanimous)
| SuperBrawl 28
| 
| align=center| 3
| align=center| 5:00
| Honolulu, Hawaii, United States
| 
|-
| Draw
| align=center| 14–9–2
| Dennis Hallman
| Draw
| KOTC 19: Street Fighter
| 
| align=center| 2
| align=center| 5:00
| San Jacinto, California, United States
| 
|-
| Draw
| align=center| 14–9–1
| Shonie Carter
| Draw
| SuperBrawl 27
| 
| align=center| 3
| align=center| 5:00
| Honolulu, Hawaii, United States
| 
|-
| Loss
| align=center| 14–9
| Stephan Potvin
| Submission (toe hold)
| UCC Hawaii
| 
| align=center| 3
| align=center| 3:18
| Honolulu, Hawaii, United States
| 
|-
| Loss
| align=center| 14–8
| Masanori Suda
| Decision (majority)
| Shooto: Treasure Hunt 7
| 
| align=center| 3
| align=center| 5:00
| Osaka, Japan
| 
|-
| Loss
| align=center| 14–7
| Izuru Takeuchi
| Decision (majority)
| Shooto: Treasure Hunt 1
| 
| align=center| 3
| align=center| 5:00
| Tokyo, Japan
| 
|-
| Win
| align=center| 14–6
| Shannon Ritch
| TKO (punches)
| Warriors Quest 3
| 
| align=center| 1
| align=center| 2:17
| Honolulu, Hawaii, United States
| 
|-
| Loss
| align=center| 13–6
| Jermaine Andre
| TKO (punches)
| World Fighting Alliance 1
| 
| align=center| 1
| align=center| 3:11
| Las Vegas, Nevada, United States
| 
|-
| Win
| align=center| 13–5
| Pete Spratt
| KO (knee)
| Warriors Quest 2
| 
| align=center| 3
| align=center| 4:36
| Hawaii, United States
| 
|-
| Win
| align=center| 12–5
| Joe Stevenson
| Decision (unanimous)
| Warriors Quest 1
| 
| align=center| 3
| align=center| 5:00
| Honolulu, Hawaii, United States
| 
|-
| Win
| align=center| 11–5
| Dave Strasser
| Submission (armbar)
| SuperBrawl 21
| 
| align=center| 2
| align=center| 4:42
| Honolulu, Hawaii, United States
| 
|-
| Win
| align=center| 10–5
| Brian Sleeman
| Submission (armbar)
| KOTC 8: Bombs Away
| 
| align=center| 2
| align=center| 2:03
| Williams, California, United States
| 
|-
| Win
| align=center| 9–5
| J.T. Taylor
| TKO (knees)
| Hawaii Combat 2
| 
| align=center| 2
| align=center| 0:33
| Waipahu, Hawaii, United States
| 
|-
| Win
| align=center| 8–5
| Jordon Klimp
| TKO (punches)
| IFC: Warriors Challenge 11
| 
| align=center| 1
| align=center| 3:07
| Fresno, California, United States
| 
|-
| Win
| align=center| 7–5
| Jason Von Flue
| TKO (punches)
| IFC: Warriors Challenge 10
| 
| align=center| 1
| align=center| N/A
| Friant, California, United States
| 
|-
| Loss
| align=center| 6–5
| Erik Paulson
| Decision (unanimous)
| SuperBrawl 17
| 
| align=center| 3
| align=center| 5:00
| Honolulu, Hawaii, United States
| 
|-
| Win
| align=center| 6–4
| Kim Mason
| TKO (punches)
| SuperBrawl 16
| 
| align=center| 2
| align=center| 3:44
| Honolulu, Hawaii, United States
| 
|-
| Loss
| align=center| 5–4
| Yuki Sasaki
| Submission (triangle armbar)
| Shooto: R.E.A.D. 1
| 
| align=center| 3
| align=center| 2:20
| Tokyo, Japan
| 
|-
| Win
| align=center| 5–3
| Deshon Dungey
| Submission (rear-naked choke)
| SuperBrawl 15
| 
| align=center| 1
| align=center| 4:21
| Honolulu, Hawaii, United States
| 
|-
| Win
| align=center| 4–3
| John Chrisostomo
| TKO (cut)
| SuperBrawl 14
| 
| align=center| 1
| align=center| 1:15
| Guam
| 
|-
| Win
| align=center| 3–3
| Skip McNeil
| TKO (punches)
| SuperBrawl 14
| 
| align=center| 1
| align=center| 0:14
| Guam
| 
|-
| Loss
| align=center| 2–3
| Marcos da Silva
| Submission (rear-naked choke)
| SuperBrawl 13
| 
| align=center| 1
| align=center| 2:19
| Hawaii, United States
| 
|-
| Win
| align=center| 2–2
| James Zikic
| Decision (majority)
| SuperBrawl 12
| 
| align=center| 3
| align=center| 5:00
| Hawaii, United States
| 
|-
| Loss
| align=center| 1–2
| James Zikic
| Submission (rear-naked choke)
| SuperBrawl 11
| 
| align=center| 1
| align=center| 3:40
| Hawaii, United States
| 
|-
| Win
| align=center| 1–1
| Paul Cutts
| TKO (punches)
| SuperBrawl 11
| 
| align=center| 1
| align=center| 0:15
| Hawaii, United States
| 
|-
| Loss
| align=center| 0–1
| Eugene Jackson
| Technical Submission (forearm choke)
| SuperBrawl 8
| 
| align=center| 1
| align=center| 1:17
| Hawaii, United States
|

References

External links
 
 

1970 births
Living people
American male mixed martial artists
Welterweight mixed martial artists
Middleweight mixed martial artists
Mixed martial artists utilizing wrestling
Ultimate Fighting Championship male fighters